Putra Post is a fortnightly tabloid launched by supporters of the former Prime Minister of Malaysia Mahathir Mohamad, including the Generation Mahathir club. The purpose of this was supposedly to spread his views in the rural areas and kampungs. This comes in the spate of recent conflicts between Mahathir and the present administration of Abdullah Badawi. The newspaper is funded by businessmen close to Tun Dr Mahathir. There are conflicting reports about its cost, which varies from RM2.00 to RM2.50.

The first run, which hit newsstands in major towns and cities ahead of the Kubang Pasu UMNO division meeting on 9 September 2006, had 50,000 copies and 24 pages. The response to the inaugural edition warranted the printing of another 20,000 copies. This issue contains predominantly political content, but also includes entertainment and other features. The first page shows a picture of Mahathir, with an article entitled "Let Mahathir Speak". Also included are spoofs of various movie posters, satirising the current political situation.

References 

Newspapers published in Malaysia